Sarcosperma is a genus of trees or shrubs in the family Sapotaceae. Their range is from India to southern China and Malesia.

Description
The leaves are well-spaced along twigs. Flowers are bisexual, with a funnel-shaped corolla. Fruits are one or two-seeded. Sarcosperma habitats are forests from sea-level to about  altitude.

Species
Accepted species

References

 
Sapotaceae genera